Haruko Tanaka (b. Queens, NY 1974, d. 2019) was a Los Angeles-based artist and filmmaker.  She was awarded fellowships and residencies at the Japanese American National Museum and the Echo Park Film Center.  Tanaka is also part of the psychic duo Krystal Krunch along with Asher Hartman.  Her videos, performances, and intuitive sessions have been shown at or sponsored by the Walker Art Center, the Tang Museum, The Hammer Museum, Los Angeles County Arts Commission, Southern Exposure, and Machine Project, among others. She earned her BFA in art at the University of Southern California in 1997. Shen then received her MFA in photography at the California Institute of the Arts in 2003.

References

1974 births
Living people
Artists from New York City
American women artists
American women film directors
Film directors from New York City
21st-century American women